This is a discography of the recorded music of the British composer and pianist Alan Bush. The chief sources for the listing are (a) Lewis Foreman's discography published as an appendix in Nancy Bush's Alan Bush:Music Politics and Life, in which the earlier (mainly 78rpm and LP) recordings appear, and (b) the Alan Bush Music Trust, founded in 1997 two years after the composer's death, which maintains and updates a list of recordings on its website.

There are a number of performances of Bush's work available on Youtube, including Symphonies 1, 2 and 4, the Piano Concerto, Dance Overture, the Symphonic Movement "Africa", Variations, Nocturne and Finale, the Scherzo for Wind Orchestra, the Fantasia on Soviet Themes and other works. 


Table 1: 78rpm and LP issues

Table 2: CD recordings

References

Notes

Citations

Source book

Bush, Alan